Relendo Dilermando Reis is a 1994 album recorded by the Brazilian musician Raphael Rabello. Produced by J. C. Botezelli, also known as Pelão, the album won Prêmio Sharp for Best Soloist in the same year. The disc presents many choro and waltz songs interpreted by Dilermando Reis in the past.

Track listing

Personnel

Raphael Rabello: seven string acoustic guitar

References

1994 albums
Raphael Rabello albums